James Daniel Richardson (March 10, 1843 – July 24, 1914) was an American politician and a Democrat from Tennessee for Tennessee's 5th congressional district in the United States House of Representatives from 1885 through 1905.

Early life and education
James Daniel Richardson was born in Rutherford County, Tennessee, son of John Watkins and Augusta M. Starnes Richardson. He attended the country schools and Franklin College, near Nashville. He married Alabama Pippen on January 18, 1865, and they had five children, Annie Augusta, Ida Lee, James Daniel, Allie Sue, and John Watkins. Before graduating from college, Richardson enlisted in the Confederate States Army during the American Civil War, and served nearly four years. The first year he was a private and the remaining three years as a first lieutenant and the adjutant of the 45th Tennessee Infantry Regiment.

Career
Richardson studied law; was admitted to the bar and commenced practice January 1, 1867, in Murfreesboro, Tennessee. He was elected to the Tennessee House of Representatives, serving from 1871 to 1873, and then to the Tennessee Senate, serving from 1873 to 1875. He was a delegate to the Democratic National Conventions in 1876, 1896, and 1900, and presided as permanent chairman at the 1900 convention.

Elected as a Democratic to the Forty-ninth and to the nine succeeding Congresses, Richardson served from March 4, 1885, to March 3, 1905.  He was among the earliest U.S. House Minority Leaders, holding that position from 1899 to 1903, during the 56th and 57th United States Congresses.

Pursuant to an act of Congress on August 20, 1894, Richardson was charged with compiling the "Messages and Papers of the Presidents," a multi-volume work including every single important document from the federal Government, from the early days of President Washington through the second administration of Grover Cleveland, plus some papers from the administration of William McKinley.

Death
Richardson died on July 24, 1914 (age 71 years, 136 days) in Murfreesboro, Tennessee. He is interred at Evergreen Cemetery.

Personal life
James Richardson was a freemason and was raised in Mt. Moriah Lodge 18, in Murfreesboro, on October 12, 1867. He was elected the Grand Master of the Grand Lodge of Tennessee in 1873. He also became the eleventh Sovereign Grand Commander of the Scottish Rite's Supreme Council. He held this office from 1900 until his death until 1914.

References

External links
 
 
 
 
 
 

1843 births
1914 deaths
19th-century American politicians
Confederate States Army officers
Democratic Party members of the United States House of Representatives from Tennessee
Grand Masters of the Grand Lodge of Tennessee
Democratic Party members of the Tennessee House of Representatives
Minority leaders of the United States House of Representatives
People from Rutherford County, Tennessee
Democratic Party Tennessee state senators